Perilipin, also known as lipid droplet-associated protein, Perilipin 1, or PLIN, is a protein that, in humans, is encoded by the PLIN  gene. The perilipins are a family of proteins that associate with the surface of lipid droplets. Phosphorylation of perilipin is essential for the mobilization of fats in adipose tissue.

Perilipin family of proteins 
Perilipin is part of a gene family with six currently-known members. In vertebrates, closely related genes include adipophilin (also known as adipose differentiation-related protein or Perilipin 2), TIP47 (Perilipin 3), Perilipin 4 and Perilipin 5 (also called MLDP, LSDP5, or OXPAT). Insects express related proteins, LSD1 and LSD2, in fat bodies. The yeast Saccharomyces cerevisiae expresses PLN1 (formerly PET10), that stabilizes lipid droplets and aids in their assembly.

Evolution 
The perilipins are considered to have their origins in a common ancestral gene which, during the first and second vertebrate genome duplication,  gave rise to six types of PLIN genes.

Composition and structure

Human Perilipin 
Human perilipin-1 is composed by 522 amino acids, which add up to a molecular mass of 55.990 kDa. It presents an estimated number of 15 phosphorylation sites (residues 81, 85, 126, 130, 132, 137, 174, 299, 301, 382, 384, 408, 436, 497, 499 and 522) from which 3 -those in bold- have been suggested to be relevant for stimulated-lipolysis through PKA phosphorylation - they correspond respectively to PKA Phosphorylation sites 1, 5 and 6. A compositional bias of Glutamic acid can be found between residues 307 and 316.  Its secondary structure has been suggested to be conformed exclusively by partially hydrophobic α-helixes, as well as the respective coils and bends.

Whereas perilipin-1 is coded by a single gene, alternative mRNA splicing processes can led to three protein isoforms (Perilipin A, B and C). Both Perilipin A and B present common N-terminal regions, differing in the C-terminal ones. Concretely, beginning from the N-terminal of Perilipin-1, a PAT domain -characteristic of its protein family- can be found, followed by also characteristic repeated sequence of 13 residues -which form amphipathic helixes with an active role in  linking membranes.- and a 4-helix bundle before the C-terminal carbon In Perilipin A, lipophile nature is conferred by the slightly hydrophobic amino acids concentrated in the central 25% of the sequence, region that anchors the protein to the core of the lipid droplet.

Murine Perilipin 
Unlike its human orthologous it is composed by 517 amino acids in the primary structure of which several regions can be identified. Three moderately hydrophobic sequences (H1, H2, H3) of 18 rem (243-260 aa), 23 rem (320-332 aa) and 16 rem (349-364 aa) can be identified in the centre of the protein, as well as an acidic region of 28 residues where both glutamic and aspartic acids add up to 19 of them. Five sequences 18 residues long that could form amphipathic β-pleated sheets -according to a prediction made through LOCATE program- are found between aa 111 and 182. Serines occupying positions 81, 222, 276, 433, 492 and 517 act as phosphorylation sites -numbered from 1 to 6- for PKA, as well as several other threonines and serines which add up to 27 phosphorylation sites.

Function 

Perilipin is a protein that coats lipid droplets (LDs) in adipocytes, the fat-storing cells in adipose tissue. In fact, PLIN1 is greatly expressed in white adipocytes.

It controls adipocyte lipid metabolism. It handles essential functions in the regulation of basal and hormonally stimulated lipolysis and also rises the formation of large LDs which implies an increase in the synthesis of triglycerides.

In humans, Perilipin A is the most abundant protein associated with the adipocyte LDs and lower PLIN1 expression is related with higher rates of lipolysis.

Under basal conditions, Perilipin acts as a protective coating of LDs from the body's natural lipases, such as hormone-sensitive lipase (HSL) and adipose triglyceride lipase (ATGL), which break triglycerides into glycerol and free fatty acids for use in lipid metabolism.

In times of energy deficit, Perilipin is hyperphosphorylated by PKA following β-adrenergic receptor activation. Phosphorylated perilipin changes conformation, exposing the stored lipids to hormone-sensitive lipase-mediated lipolysis.

Modulator of adipocyte lipid metabolism 
Specifically, in the basal state Perilipin A allows a low level of basal lipolysis by reducing the access of cytosolic lipases to stored triacylglycerol in LDs. It is found at their surface in a complex with CGI-58, the co-activator of ATGL. ATGL might also be in this complex but it is quiescent.

Under lipolytically stimulated conditions, PKA is activated and phosphorylates up to 6 Serine residues on Perilipin A (Ser81, 222, 276, 433, 492, and 517) and 2 on HSL (Ser659, and 660). Although PKA also phosphorylates HSL, which can increase its activity, the more than 50-fold increase in fat mobilization (triggered by epinephrine) is primarily due to Perilipin phosphorylation.

Then, Phosphorylated HSL translocates to the LD surface and associates with Perilipin A and Adipocyte fatty acid-binding protein (AFABP). Consequently, HSL gains access to triacylglycerol (TAG) and diacylglycerol (DAG), substrates in LDs. Also, CGI-58 separates from the LD outer layer which leads to a redistribution of ATGL. In particular, ATGL interacts with Perilipin A through phosphorylated Ser517.

As a result, PKA phosphorylation implies an enriched colocation of HLS and ATGL which facilitates maximal lipolysis by the two lipases.

Clinical significance 

Perilipin is an important regulator of lipid storage. Both an overexpression or deficiency of the protein, caused by a mutation, lead to severe health issues.

Overexpression 
Perilipin expression is elevated in obese animals and humans. Polymorphisms in the human perilipin (PLIN) gene have been associated with variance in body-weight regulation and may be a genetic influence on obesity risk in humans.

This protein can me modified by O-linked acetylglucosamine (O-GlNac) moieties and the enzyme that intervenes is O-GlcNAc transferase (OGT). An abundance of OGT obstructs lipolysis and benefits diet-induced obesity and whole-body insulin resistance. Studies also propose that an overexpression of adipose O-GlcNAc signaling is a molecular expression of obesity and diabetes in humans.

Deficiency 
Perilipin-null mice eat more food than wild-type mice, but gain 1/3 less fat than wild-type mice on the same diet; perilipin-null mice are thinner, with more lean muscle mass. Perilipin-null mice also exhibit enhanced leptin production and a greater tendency to develop insulin resistance than wild-type mice. Even though perilipin-null mice present less fat mass and a higher insulin resistance, they do not show signs of a whole lipodystrophic phenotype.

In humans, studies suggest that a deficiency of PLIN1 causes lipodystrophic syndromes, which disables the optimal accumulation of triglycerides in adipocytes that derives in an abnormal deposition of lipids in tissues such as skeletal muscle and liver. The storage of lipids in the liver leads to insulin resistance and hypertriglyceridemia. Affected patients are characterized by a subcutaneous fat with smaller than normal adipocytes, macrophage infiltration and fibrosis.

These findings affirm a new primary form of inherited lipodystrophy and emphasize on the severe metabolic consequences of a defect in the formation of lipid droplets in adipose tissue.

In particular, variants 13041A>G and 14995A>T have been associated with increased risk of obesity in women and 11482G>A has been associated with decreased perilipin expression and increased lipolysis in women.

References

Further reading 

 
 
 
 
 
 
 
 
 
 
 
 
 
 
 
 
 
 
 

Metabolism
Human proteins